Pennathur  is a panchayat town in Vellore district in the Indian state of Tamil Nadu.

Demographics
 India census, Pennathur had a population of 8014. Males constitute 49% of the population and females 51%. Pennathur has an average literacy rate of 68%, higher than the national average of 59.5%: male literacy is 76%, and female literacy is 60%. In Pennathur, 10% of the population is under 6 years of age.

References

Cities and towns in Vellore district